Robert II of Dreux (1154 – 28 December 1218), Count of Dreux and Braine, was the eldest surviving son of Robert I, Count of Dreux, and Agnes de Baudemont, countess of Braine, and a grandson of King Louis VI of France.

He participated in the Third Crusade, at the Siege of Acre and the Battle of Arsuf. He took part in the war in Normandy against the Angevin kings between 1193 and 1204. Count Robert had seized the castle of Nonancourt from Richard I of England while he was imprisoned in Germany in late 1193. The count also participated in the Albigensian Crusade in 1210. In 1214 he fought alongside King Philip Augustus at the Battle of Bouvines.

Marriages and children
His first marriage with Mahaut of Burgundy (1150–1192) in 1178 ended with separation in 1181 and produced no children. The excuse for the annulment was consanguinity. Mahaut and Robert were both great-great-grandchildren of William I, Count of Burgundy and his wife Etiennette and they were both Capetian descendants of Robert II of France.

His second marriage to Yolande de Coucy (1164–1222), the daughter of Ralph I, Lord of Coucy and Agnès de Hainaut, produced several children:
 Robert III ( 1185 – 1234), Count of Dreux and Braine
 Peter Ι (c. 1190 - 1250), Duke of Brittany
 Henry of Dreux (c. 1193 – 1240), Archbishop of Reims
 John of Dreux (c. 1198 – 1239), Count of Vienne and Mâcon
 Philippa of Dreux (1192–1242), who married Henry II of Bar
 Alix of Dreux, married Walter IV of Vienne, Lord of Salins, then married Renard II of Choiseul
 Agnes of Dreux (1195–1258), married Stephen III of Auxonne
 Yolande of Dreux (1196–1239), married Raoul II of Lusignan

Tomb
Count Robert's tomb bore the following inscription, in Medieval Latin hexameters with internal rhyme:

Stirpe satus rēgum, pius et custōdia lēgum,
Brannę Rōbertus comes hīc requiescit opertus,
Et jacet Agnētis situs ad vestīgia mātris.

Of which the translation is: "Born from the race of kings, and a devoted guardian of the laws, Robert, Count of Braine, here rests covered, and lies buried by the remains of his mother Agnes."

It is also dated Anno Gracię M. CC. XVIII. die innocentum, that is, "In the Year of Grace 1218, on the Feast of the Holy Innocents."

Ancestry

Notes

References
 
 
 
 
 Mémoires de la Société des lettres, sciences et arts de Bar-le-Duc, Vol.2, Ed. Société des lettres, sciences et arts de Bar-le-Duc, Contant Laguerre Imprimeur Editeur, 1903.
 
 
 
 
 
 
 
 

Dreux, Robert II, Count of
Dreux, Robert II, Count of
Dreux, Robert II, Count of
Dreux, Robert II, Count of
Counts of Dreux
House of Dreux
Burials at the Abbey of Saint-Yved de Braine